PartyNextDoor 3 (stylized in all caps and also as P3) is the second studio album by Canadian recording artist PartyNextDoor. It was released on August 12, 2016, by OVO Sound and Warner Records. The album was supported by two singles: "Come and See Me" featuring Drake, and "Not Nice".

Singles
The album's first single, "Come and See Me" was released digitally on the iTunes Store and Apple Music on March 23, 2016. The song features guest vocals from the fellow Canadian rapper and label-mate Drake, with production that was provided by 40.

The album's second single, "Not Nice" was released digitally as the pre-order for the album on the iTunes Store and Apple Music on July 22, 2016 and later sent to radio as the second official single. The track was also co-written by Drake, with the production that was provided by 40, Illangelo, Supa Dups and Nineteen85.

"Don't Know How" was released on the iTunes Store and Apple Music as the first promotional single on August 5, 2016. The song was produced by Bizness Boi and Neenyo.

Critical reception

PartyNextDoor 3 received positive reviews from music critics. At Metacritic, which assigns a normalized rating out of 100 to reviews from mainstream publications, the album received an average score of 69, based on eight reviews, indicating "generally favorable reviews". Writing for Exclaim!, Ryan B. Patrick praised the album's "on point" production but criticized PartyNextDoor's tendency to "get lost in his own haze of vulnerabilities".

Commercial performance
PartyNextDoor 3 debuted at number three on the US Billboard 200, earning 50,000 album equivalent units with 29,000 copies in pure album sales in its first week of release. On January 22, 2019, the album was certified gold by the Recording Industry Association of America (RIAA) for combined sales and album-equivalent units of over 500,000 units in the United States.

Track listing
Credits adapted from AllMusic.

Notes 
  signifies a co-producer
  signifies an additional producer

Charts

Weekly charts

Year-end charts

Certifications

Release history

References

2016 albums
Albums produced by Illangelo
Albums produced by Nineteen85
Albums produced by Noah "40" Shebib
Albums produced by Supa Dups
Albums produced by PartyNextDoor
PartyNextDoor albums
OVO Sound albums
Warner Records albums